Eugene Barton Evans (July 11, 1922 – April 1, 1998) was an American actor who appeared in numerous television series, television films, and feature films between 1947 and 1989.

Background
Evans was born in Holbrook, Arizona and raised in Colton, California. Right after finishing high school, he began performing in summer stock at the Penthouse Theatre in Altadena, California. Evans served in the United States Army during World War II and achieved the rank of sergeant. He performed with a theatrical troupe of GIs in Europe. 

He made his film debut in the 1947 film Under Colorado Skies as Henchman Red, and appeared in dozens of films and television programs. He specialized in playing tough guys, such as soldiers and lawmen.

Acting career
Evans appeared in numerous films produced, directed, and written by Samuel Fuller. In his memoir, A Third Face, Fuller described meeting Evans when casting his Korean War film The Steel Helmet (1950). Fuller threw an M1 Garand rifle at Evans, who caught it and inspected it as a soldier would have done. Evans had been a United States Army engineer in World War II. Fuller kept Evans and refused John Wayne for the role and fought to keep him despite Robert L. Lippert and his partner wanting Larry Parks for the role. Fuller walked off the film and would not return until Evans was reinstated. Evans also appeared in Fuller's Fixed Bayonets!, Hell and High Water, Shock Corridor and lost 30 pounds to play the lead in Park Row.

Evans portrayed the authoritarian but wise father Rob McLaughlin on the 1956-1957 television series My Friend Flicka. He next co-starred in 1958 as Major Al Arthur in Damn Citizen, a film based on the life of crusading State Police superintendent Francis Grevemberg of Louisiana. In 1960, Evans was cast as Otis Stockert in "The Frontiersman" on the Western series Wichita Town. The same year, he was cast as Boone Hackett in the episode "Die Twice" of the Western series Johnny Ringo. He was cast in 1960 as army sergeant Dan Phillips in the episode "The Quota" of Riverboat. In the story, Phillips shanghais Grey Holden (Darren McGavin) and a crew member of the river vessel Enterprise to meet the army's "quota" for new recruits. 

In 1961, Evans guest-starred as Sheriff Tom Wilson in "Incident on the Road Back" in Rawhide. He then was cast as Walter Kopek, an undercover agent of the United States Treasury Department in the 1963 episode "The Moonshiners" of GE True, hosted by Jack Webb. In this episode's plot, Kopek moves against a bootlegging operation in Florida run by the mobster Bill Munger (Robert Emhardt).

Evans was cast as the historical Winfield Scott Stratton, a miner in Colorado, in the 1964 episode "Sixty-Seven Miles of Gold" on Death Valley Days, hosted by Stanley Andrews. 

In 1966, Evans appeared on the drama series Perry Mason as Sheriff "Moose" Dalton in "The Case of the Scarlet Scandal". He starred as well in Peopletoys in 1974 with Leif Garrett, and in the fall of 1976, Evans starred on the adventure series Spencer's Pilots.

In January 1979, Evans appeared as Garrison Southworth in one episode of Dallas. He guest-starred in 10 episodes of Gunsmoke. In 1965, Evans guest-starred as Jake Burnett in the episode "Vendetta" of The Legend of Jesse James. Two years later, he appeared as Deedricks in the episode "Breakout" of Custer.

In January 1982, Evans performed in the role of war reporter Clayton Kibbee in an episode of CBS's M*A*S*H titled "Blood and Guts". He also appeared on stage in the late 1980s as the gruesome Papa in the stage production Papa Is All, directed by playwright Tommy F. Scott in Jackson, Tennessee. Evans retired to a farm in Tennessee following his role in the original film version of Walking Tall.

He was active in the local theater in Jackson, Tennessee, with “On Borrowed Time” and “Love Letters” as well as “Papa is All”.

Death
Evans died at age 75 of heart failure at Jackson-Madison County General Hospital in Jackson, Tennessee, on April 1, 1998.

Partial filmography

Under Colorado Skies (1947) - Henchman Red
Berlin Express (1948) - Train Sergeant (uncredited)
Assigned to Danger (1948) - Joey
Larceny (1948) - Horace (uncredited)
Criss Cross (1949) - Donlan (uncredited)
Mother Is a Freshman (1949) - Bit Part (uncredited)
It Happens Every Spring (1949) - Batter Mueller (uncredited)
The Asphalt Jungle (1950) - Policeman at Ciavelli's Apartment (uncredited)
Armored Car Robbery (1950) - William 'Ace' Foster
Never a Dull Moment (1950) - Hunter (uncredited)
Wyoming Mail (1950) - Shep
Dallas (1950) - Drunk in Saloon (uncredited)
The Steel Helmet (1951) - Sgt. Zack
Storm Warning (1951) - Ku Klux Klansman (uncredited)
Sugarfoot (1951) - Billings
I Was an American Spy (1951) - Cpl. John Boone
Ace in the Hole (1951) - Deputy Sheriff
Force of Arms (1951) - Sgt. Smiley 'Mac' McFee
Fixed Bayonets! (1951) - Sgt. Rock
Mutiny (1952) - Hook
Park Row (1952) - Phineas Mitchell
Thunderbirds (1952) - Sgt. Mike Braggart
The Golden Blade (1953) - Hadi
Donovan's Brain (1953) - Dr. Frank Schratt
Hell and High Water (1954) - Chief Holter
The Long Wait (1954) - Servo
Cattle Queen of Montana (1954) - Tom McCord
Crashout (1955) - Maynard 'Monk' Collins
Wyoming Renegades (1955) - Butch Cassidy / George Leroy Parker
Jet Pilot (1957) - Airfield Sgt. (uncredited)
The Helen Morgan Story (1957) - Whitey Krause
The Sad Sack (1957) - Sgt. Major Elmer Pulley
Damn Citizen (1958) - Maj. Al Arthur
Young and Wild (1958) - Det. Sgt. Fred Janusz
The Bravados (1958) - John Butler
Money, Women and Guns (1958) - Sheriff Abner Crowley
Revolt in the Big House (1958) - Lou Gannon
The Giant Behemoth (1959) - Steve Karnes
The Hangman (1959) - Big Murph Murphy
Operation Petticoat (1959) - Chief Molumphry
Gold of the Seven Saints (1961) - McCracken
Shock Corridor (1963) - Boden
Apache Uprising (1965) - Jess Cooney
Nevada Smith (1966) – Sam Sand
Waco (1966) - Deputy Sheriff Jim O'Neill
The War Wagon (1967) - Deputy Hoag
Dragnet (1969, TV movie) - Capt. Hugh Brown
Support Your Local Sheriff! (1969) - Tom Danby
The Ballad of Cable Hogue (1970) - Clete
There Was a Crooked Man... (1970) - Col Wolff
The Intruders (Shot in 1967, released in 1970) - Cole Younger
Support Your Local Gunfighter (1971) - Butcher
Walking Tall (1973) - Sheriff Al Thurman
Gentle Savage (1973) - Sheriff McVaney
Pat Garrett and Billy the Kid (1973) - Mr. Horrell
Sidekicks (1974, TV movie) - Sam
Knife for the Ladies (1974) - Hooker
Peopletoys (1974) - Papa Doc
The Macahans (1976) - Dutton
Fire! (1977, TV movie) - Dan Harter
The Magic of Lassie (1978) - Sheriff Andrews
The Sacketts (1979, TV movie) - Benson Bigelow
Sourdough (1981) - Narrator
The Shadow Riders (1982, TV Movie) - Colonel Holiday Hammond (Gunrunner)
Travis McGee (1983, TV movie) - Meyer 
Blame It on the Night (1984) - Extra (uncredited)
The Alamo: 13 Days to Glory (1987, TV movie) - McGregor
Once Upon a Texas Train (1988, TV movie) - Fargo Parker
Split (1989) - Evangelist

Television

 The Lone Ranger – episode Devil's Pass - Beef Corson (1950)
 The Lone Ranger – episode The Star Witness - Henchman Nat (1950)
 The Lone Ranger – episode Behind the Law - Henchman Link (1951)
 My Friend Flicka series (Feb 1956 - Aug 1957)
 The Restless Gun episode The Coward - Will Fetter (1958)
 Wagon Train - episode The Sarah Drummond Story - Jeb Drummond (1958)
 Death Valley Days – 4 episodes (1959-1964)
 Rawhide – 4 episodes (1959-1965)
 Bonanza – episode The Fear Merchants - Andy Fulmer (1960)
 Alfred Hitchcock Presents - episode The Kerry Blue - Ned O'Malley (1962) 
 The Virginian - episode The Accomplice - Sheriff Luke Donaldson (1962) naked city 1962
 Bonanza – episode Journey Remembered - Lucas Rockwell (1963)
 Gunsmoke - episode Extradition: Parts 1 & 2 - Charlie Hacker (1963)
 Wagon Train - episode The Duncan McIvor Story - Sgt. Jake Orly (1964)
 Daniel Boone – episode The First Stone - Joshua Craig (1965)
 Branded – episode The Bounty - Matthew Paxton (1965)
 The Legend of Jesse James – episode Vendetta - Jake Burnett (1965)
 The Iron Horse – episode The Pride of the Bottom of the Barrel - Sgt. Stoddard (1966)
 The Virginian - episode Trail to Ashley Mountain - Blanchard (1966) 
 Ironside – episode Message from Beyond - Al Hayes (1967)
 Gunsmoke - episode A Hat - Clint Sorils (1967)
 Gunsmoke - episode The First People - Thomas Evans (1968)
 Daniel Boone – episode The Man - Stark (1969)
 Dragnet 1966 – TV movie - Captain Hugh Brown (1969)
 Bonanza – episode The Trouble with Trouble - Montana Perkins (1970)
 Here Come the Brides  - episode S2E20:  Two Worlds - Jacob Marsh (1970)
 The Men From Shiloh, the rebranded name of The Virginian - episode With Love, Bullets and Valentines - Harv Plimpton (1970)
 Gunsmoke - episode Snow Train: Parts 1 & 2 - Billy (1970) 
 Mannix – episode Murder Times Three - Dan Brockway (1971)
 Longstreet – episode Wednesday's Child - Fred Decker (1971)
 Nichols – episode Deer Crossing - Durand (1971) 
 Gunsmoke - episode Phoenix - Jess Hume (1971)
 Alias Smith and Jones - episode The Men That Corrupted Hadleyburg - Phillips (1972)
 Gunsmoke - episode Tatum - Bodie Tatum (1972)
 Pat Garrett & Billy the Kid – Mr. Horrell (1973) 
 Ironside – episode Downhill All the Way Parker (1973) 
 Gunsmoke - episode The Iron Blood of Courage - Shaw Anderson (1974) 
 Gunsmoke – episode Thirty a Month and Found  - Will Parmalee (1974)
 Spencer's Pilots – 6 episodes - Spencer Parish (1976)
 The Rhinemann Exchange - TV miniseries - Colonel Barton (1977)
 The Incredible Hulk - episode Rainbow's End - Jimmy Kelly (1978)
 Lassie: A New Beginning – TV movie - Sheriff Marsh (1978)
 The Hardy Boys/Nancy Drew Mysteries – episode Oh Say Can You Sing (1978)
 The Eddie Capra Mysteries - episode How Do I Kill Thee? (1978)
 Lassie: A New Beginning – episode Oh Say Can You Sing – Sheriff Marsh (1978)
 Charlie's Angels - episode Cruising Angels - Webner (1979)
 Fantasy Island – episode Tattoo: the Love God/Magnolia Blossoms - Confederate Asking for money (1979)
 Casino - TV movie - Captain K.L. Fitzgerald (1980)
 Vega$ - episode Murder by Mirrors - Marcus Hinton (1981)
 Hart to Hart - episode Murder in the Saddle - Ray Dudley (1981)
 M*A*S*H  - episode Blood and Guts - Clayton Kibbee (1982)
 Simon & Simon - episode Betty Grable Flies Again - Arch McBride (1983)
 Murder, She Wrote - episode We're Off to Kill the Wizard - Nils Highlander (1984)
 The A-Team - episode Bounty - Darrow (1985)
 Murder, She Wrote - episode Trial by Error - Otto Fry (1986)
 Simon & Simon - episode The Last Harangue - Freight Yard Supervisor (1986)
 Simon & Simon - episode Deep Water Death - Captain Kyle Bates (1987)
 Scarecrow and Mrs. King – episode Mission of Gold  - Gus Weinstein (1987)

References

External links
 

1922 births
1998 deaths
Male actors from Arizona
Male actors from California
American male film actors
American male television actors
United States Army non-commissioned officers
United States Army personnel of World War II
Actors from San Bernardino, California
People from Holbrook, Arizona
People from Jackson, Tennessee
Burials in Tennessee
20th-century American male actors
Western (genre) television actors
Male Western (genre) film actors